Air Force Headquarters (AFHQ) is the Headquarters of the Royal Australian Air Force provides strategic leadership to the Air Force and provides policy guidance for Air Force activities to the rest of the Australian Defence Force and Australian Government.

Through AFHQ, the Chief of Air Force oversees Air Force activities that raise, train and sustain assigned Air Force capabilities.

The Deputy Chief of Air Force acts as the manager of the headquarters and provides strategic leadership of Air Force Headquarters in the following domains:

 Air Power concepts and doctrine
 Enterprise Design Strategy
 Preparedness
 Policy
 AFHQ Resource and Business Management
 Corporate Governance
 Reputation, brand management and heritage preservation
 Holistic workforce and Cadet management
 Personnel wellbeing mechanisms and organisational culture.

The Head of Air Force Capability acts as the Air Force Capability Manager representative during modernisation and sustainment activities and provides strategic leadership of Air Force Headquarters in the following domains:

 air and space enabling capability concepts
 force structure requirements for Air Force
 IIP management and affordable development of new capability systems
 transition of new capabilities
 joint logistics systems planning
 capability workforce planning.

Key focus areas include:

 resources
 personnel
 force placement;
 infrastructure; and
 future force considerations.

References

Royal Australian Air Force
Air force headquarters